Lev Vasilyevich Shubnikov (September 29, 1901 – November 10, 1937) was a Soviet experimental physicist who worked in the Netherlands and USSR. In 1937 he was executed during the Ukrainian Physics and Technology Institute Affair on the basis of falsified charges as part of the Great Purge.

Early life 
Shubnikov was born into the family of a Saint Petersburg  accountant. After graduating from a gymnasium he entered Leningrad University. This was the first year of the Russian Civil War and he was the only student of that year attending the physics department. While yachting in the Gulf of Finland in 1921, he accidentally sailed from Saint Petersburg to Finland, was sent to Germany and could not return to Russia until 1922. He then continued his education in the Leningrad Polytechnical Institute, graduating in 1926. During his university training he worked with Ivan Obreimov, developing a new method for growing monocrystals of metals.

Career 
In 1926, at the recommendation of Abram Ioffe, he was sent to the Leiden cryogenic laboratory of Wander Johannes de Haas in the Netherlands; he worked there until 1930. Shubnikov  studied bismuth crystals with low impurity concentrations, and in cooperation with de Haas he discovered magnetoresistance oscillations at low temperatures in magnetic fields (the Shubnikov–de Haas effect). The importance of this effect for condensed state physics became completely clear only much later. Today this effect is one of the principal instruments used in studying the quantum electron properties of solids. He was also first to observe gradual penetration of magnetic field in some superconductors: the hallmark of type-II superconductivity.

The National Scientific Center Kharkiv Institute of Physics and Technology was founded by Abram Ioffe in Kharkiv in Ukraine in 1928. Ivan V. Obreimov was the first director of the National Scientific Center Kharkiv Institute of Physics and Technology in 1928.

In 1930, Shubnikov returned to Kharkiv and worked to establish there the first Soviet cryogenic laboratory. The Lev Shubnikov Low Temperature Laboratory at the National Scientific Center Kharkiv Institute of Physics and Technology was founded in Kharkiv, Ukraine in 1931. Lev Shubnikov was a head of the cryogenic laboratory at the National Scientific Center Kharkiv Institute of Physics and Technology in 1931–1937. In 1935, Rjabinin, Schubnikow experimentally discovered the Type-II superconductors at the cryogenic laboratory at the National Scientific Center Kharkov Institute of Physics and Technology in Kharkiv, Ukraine.

Lev Shubnikov discovered the antiferromagnetism (in 1935) and paramagnetism (in 1936, together with Boris G. Lazarev) of solid state hydrogen. Lev Shubnikov  was one of the first to study liquid helium. Boris G. Lazarev was a head of the Lev Shubnikov Low Temperature Laboratory at the National Scientific Center Kharkiv Institute of Physics and Technology in Kharkiv, Ukraine in 1938 - 1989. Presently, the Lev Shubnikov Low Temperature Laboratory at the National Scientific Center Kharkiv Institute of Physics and Technology in Kharkiv, Ukraine conducts the innovative researches in the condensed matter physics, low temperature physics, quantum physics, quantum computing.

Death
During the Stalin epoch, at the height of the Great Purge in 1937, the NKVD launched the Ukrainian Physics and Technology Institute Affair on the basis of falsified charges, and Shubnikov (along with several colleagues) was convicted and executed. He was posthumously rehabilitated. Until 1991 his true date of death was not officially acknowledged; the Great Soviet Encyclopedia gave the year as 1945.

The Shubnikov Prize has been established by the Russian Academy of Sciences.

See also
Type-II superconductor

References

External links

Shubnikov's memorial site 
Valentina Gatash Coming back, Zerkalo Nedeli N44 (519) 
Biography 
The Life, Science and Times of Lev Vasilevich Shubnikov, biography by L.J. Reinders.
 Memoirs of Lev Shubnikov's widow, Olga Trapeznikova.

Soviet  inventors
Soviet physicists
Ukrainian people of Russian descent
Great Purge victims from Russia
Soviet rehabilitations
1901 births
1937 deaths
Saint Petersburg State University alumni
Peter the Great St. Petersburg Polytechnic University alumni
Executed scientists
Experimental physicists